is a train station in Nichinan, Miyazaki Prefecture, Japan. It is operated by  JR Kyushu and is on the Nichinan Line.

Lines

Layout 
The station consists of two side platforms serving two tracks at grade. The station building is a traditional Japanese style wooden structure with a tiled roof. It is unstaffed and serves only as a waiting room. Access to the opposite side platform is by means of a level crossing. A bike shed is available at the station forecourt.

Adjacent stations

History
The line was then extended northwards in phases, reaching  by 1935. The track was extended further north with Ōdōtsu opening as the northern terminus on 1 March 1936. The route was designated the Nichinan Line on 8 May 1963. With the privatization of JNR on 1 April 1987, the station came under the control of JR Kyushu.

Passenger statistics
In fiscal 2016, the station was used by an average of 34 passengers (boarding only) per day.

See also
List of railway stations in Japan

References

External links
Ōdōtsu (JR Kyushu)

Railway stations in Miyazaki Prefecture
Railway stations in Japan opened in 1936